The 2020–21 LIU Sharks men's ice hockey season was the inaugural season of play for the program at the Division I level. The Sharks represented Long Island University and were coached by Brett Riley, in his 1st season.

Season
Prior to the season, LIU entered into a scheduling partnership with Atlantic Hockey. Due to the COVID-19 pandemic, LIU would schedule games against members of Atlantic Hockey but would not be eligible for the conference tournament. In August, the NCAA granted a blanket waiver for all winter sports, not counting the 2020–21 season against eligibility. This gave all LIU players an additional year of college hockey.

Recruiting
Due to LIU not possessing a club team the previous season, the entire varsity roster was assembled from scratch. Eleven transfers from other college programs were used as the framework for the inaugural team roster while 15 freshman were part of LIU's first recruiting class. At first, it was expected that the six non-graduate transfer players would not play for LIU in its first season. However, in December the NCAA changed its transfer rules, dropping the requirement that students had to sit out a year when changing schools.

Roster
As of October 8, 2020.

|}

Standings

Schedule and results

|-
!colspan=12 style=";" | Regular Season

Scoring statistics

Goaltending statistics

Rankings

USCHO did not release a poll in week 20.

References

LIU Sharks men's ice hockey seasons
LIU Sharks
LIU Sharks
LIU Sharks
2021 in sports in New York (state)
2020 in sports in New York (state)